The Sadies are a Canadian rock and roll / country and western band from Toronto, Ontario. The band consists of Dallas Good, Travis Good, Sean Dean and Mike Belitsky. Dallas and Travis are the sons of Margaret and Bruce Good, and nephews of Brian and Larry Good, who are members of the Canadian country group The Good Brothers.

Background
The Sadies were formed in 1994.  In 1998 the group released their first album, Precious Moments.  Several more albums followed, including In Concert Vol. 1 in 2006.

In addition to their own recordings, the Sadies often collaborate with other artists, such as Blue Rodeo, Jon Langford, Gord Downie, Andre Williams (on the 1999 country-influenced Red Dirt and the 2012 release entitled "Night and Day"), Neil Young (track "This Wheel’s on Fire" on the album Garth Hudson Presents a Canadian Celebration of The Band) and have recorded, written and toured extensively as the backing band for singer Neko Case.  They have also toured and recorded with Jon Spencer and Matt Verta-Ray as Heavy Trash, as well as John Doe. They are considered honorary members of The Mekons.  
The Sadies' music is featured in many films and television shows, for example, Adult Swim's 12 oz. Mouse. An instrumental performed by the band can be heard in episode 5 of season 1, during a scene in which Rhoda the bartender is murdered. 
On 18 May 2010, The Sadies released Darker Circles CD/LP through Outside Music and Yep Roc Records. Darker Circles was a shortlisted nominee for the 2010 Polaris Music Prize and in 2012, won a Juno Award with Mike Roberts for best video.

The Sadies are collectively members of the group The Unintended, along with Greg Keelor of Blue Rodeo and Rick White of Eric's Trip/Elevator. They also make multiple contributions to Garth Hudson's 2010 album Garth Hudson Presents: A Canadian Celebration of The Band, by performing "The Shape I'm In", and also by backing Neil Young, for "This Wheel's On Fire", and Mary Margaret O'Hara, for "Out of the Blue". All performances on that album featured Hudson on keyboards. The Sadies have performed with other members of the Good Family intermittently over the years using the name "The Good Family", and in 2013 released the album The Good Family Album, as well as performing live under that name. 

Among the band's last studio releases are Internal Sounds, released on 17 September 2013 through Outside Music; And the Conquering Sun, their 2014 collaboration with Gord Downie on Arts & Crafts Productions; and Northern Passages, released in February 2017 on Yep Roc Records.

Dallas Good died unexpectedly on February 17, 2022, at the age of 48. The cause was a recently-detected heart condition. Colder Streams, the last Sadies album completed before his death, was released in July 2022, to critical acclaim. The album was the winner of the Juno Award for Adult Alternative Album of the Year at the Juno Awards of 2023.

Discography

Albums

Singles
"Crater" (with Gordon Downie) (2014)
 The Most Despicable Man Alive b/w Old Gunga Din (2020) Ernest Jenning Record Co.

See also
Music of Canada

References

External links
 The Sadies 
 
 

Musical groups established in 1994
Musical groups from Toronto
Canadian alternative country groups
Canadian indie rock groups
Mint Records artists
1994 establishments in Ontario
Bloodshot Records artists
Juno Award for Adult Alternative Album of the Year winners